FC Metalurh Novomoskovsk is a Ukrainian amateur football club from Novomoskovsk, Dnipropetrovsk Oblast. It plays in the Dnipropetrovsk Oblast Championship (season 2013–14).

League and cup history

{|class="wikitable"
|-bgcolor="#efefef"
! Season
! Div.
! Pos.
! Pl.
! W
! D
! L
! GS
! GA
! P
!Domestic Cup
!colspan=2|Europe
!Notes
|}

 
Metalurh Novomoskovsk, FC
Football clubs in Novomoskovsk, Ukraine
Metallurgy association football clubs in Ukraine